Brannen (The Fire) is a Norwegian film from 1973. The film is based on Tarjei Vesaas's novel Brannen. Haakon Sandøy directed the film and Jan Grønli played the lead role. Unn Vibeke Hol played the girl in the film. Nils Vogt made his film debut in Brannen.

Plot
The film is about a young boy that lives alone in a modern housing complex. He has a small room with a telephone that rings more or less constantly. When he picks up the phone, he only hears a busy signal. Eventually, he flees the apartment block in panic. The boy lets himself be led by different people that appear completely unexpectedly. He gets involved in a search team looking for a young girl. When the search crew is completely exhausted after a few days, the boy finds the girl. The film has a surreal feel.

Background
Brannen is based on one of Tarjei Vesaas's most unusual novels. The film's plot and form of expression are largely true to the novel. The Norwegian Media Authority described the film as: "a young boy's nightmare-like experiences and encounter with strange fates on his journey."

Cast

 Jan Grønli as Jon 
 Bonne Gauguin as the woman
 Unn Vibeke Hol as the girl
 Kjell Stormoen as the man sawing wood
 Liliane Naumik as the fugitive
 Eva von Hanno as the waitress
 Bjarne Andersen as the man on the bench 
 Svein Berglia as the boy
 Frimann Falck Clausen as the boss
 Torgeir Fonnlid as the gravel driver
 Lars Gåsdal as the old man
 Vegard Hall as the wise one 
 Frank Iversen as a porter
 Lars Andreas Larssen as a porter
 Svein Moen as the driver
 Øyvind Øyen as a friend
 Nils Sletta as a friend 
 Nils Vogt as a young man 
 Kåre Wicklund as the father

References

External links 
 
 Brannen at the National Library of Norway
 Brannen at the Swedish Film Database

1973 films
Norwegian drama films
1970s Norwegian-language films
Films based on works by Tarjei Vesaas
1973 drama films